Vernoy may refer to:

Vernoy, Yonne, France
Vernoy, New Jersey, USA